Kahgan-e Sofla (also Romanized as Kāhgān-e Soflá; also known as Kagūn, Kāhangān, Kāhgān, and Kūgān) is a village in Poshtkuh-e Mugui Rural District, in the Central District of Fereydunshahr County, Isfahan Province, Iran. At the 2006 census, its population was 136, in 27 families.

References 

Populated places in Fereydunshahr County